The Zimmerman House is a historic home located at Columbia, South Carolina, United States. It was built in 1848, and consists of a -story main section and a one-story wing. The front façade features a Greek Revival style pedimented portico supported by two paneled wooden square columns. The house was built by Charles and Hannah Zimmerman, who operated the neighboring Zimmerman School from 1848 to 1870.

It was added to the National Register of Historic Places in 1979.

References

Houses on the National Register of Historic Places in South Carolina
Greek Revival houses in South Carolina
Houses completed in 1848
Houses in Columbia, South Carolina
National Register of Historic Places in Columbia, South Carolina